Mohamed Jabrane (born 29 November 1979) is a retired Moroccan football striker. He was a squad member at the 1997 FIFA World Youth Championship.

References

1979 births
Living people
Moroccan footballers
Maghreb de Fès players
Moghreb Tétouan players
EGS Gafsa players
Wydad de Fès players
Botola players
Tunisian Ligue Professionnelle 1 players
Association football forwards
Morocco international footballers
Moroccan expatriate footballers
Expatriate footballers in Tunisia
Moroccan expatriate sportspeople in Tunisia
Morocco under-20 international footballers